Adlai Ewing Stevenson IV (born November 4, 1956) is an American business executive and a former television and print journalist.

Early life and education
Stevenson was born on November 4, 1956, the son of Senator Adlai Stevenson III, grandson of UN Ambassador Adlai Stevenson II who was defeated in the 1952 and 1956 United States presidential elections and the great-great-grandson of Vice President Adlai E. Stevenson I.

Stevenson attended Middlesex School in Concord, Massachusetts. He earned a bachelor's degree in communications in 1978, then an MBA,  both from Northwestern University.

Career 

Stevenson was a print reporter at the City News Bureau of Chicago, and then a television reporter at WTNH, New Haven; WMBD, Peoria; KARE, Minneapolis; and WMAQ, Chicago. In 1990, he founded radio station WHZT-FM (now WGKC) in Champaign, Illinois.

Between 1994 and 2006, Stevenson worked as an acquisition specialist for media companies Lee Enterprises and Schurz Communications, and served as vice president and chief operations officer at the Evanston-based start-up Stonewater Control Systems.

Stevenson was a Managing Director, Mergers & Acquisitions at HuaMei Capital, the first U.S.-Chinese financial services joint venture, beginning in 2006.  In 2012, he began work as a financial services professional at Water Tower Financial Partners, LLC, in Chicago.

Personal life 

Stevenson's son, Adlai Ewing Stevenson V, was born in 1994. Stevenson was ambivalent about passing on his name, having joked that he would be "Adlai the Last".  He later recounted that "[w]hen my own kid was about to be born...the big debate began—were we going to continue this name thing? I was basically against it, needless to say fully aware of how being named Adlai Stevenson can be a Boy-Named-Sue-like albatross. But my dad and my wife felt strongly this was something we should do."

References

1956 births
Living people
American television journalists
Writers from Bloomington, Illinois
Businesspeople from Los Angeles
Stevenson family
American male journalists